Michael Rangel dos Santos de Almeida (born 27 May 1999), commonly known as Michael, is a Brazilian footballer who currently plays as a defender for Bnei Yehuda.

Career statistics

Club

Notes

References

External links

1999 births
Living people
Brazilian footballers
Brazil under-20 international footballers
Association football defenders
Israeli Premier League players
CR Flamengo footballers
Bnei Yehuda Tel Aviv F.C. players
Brazilian expatriate footballers
Brazilian expatriate sportspeople in Israel
Expatriate footballers in Israel
Footballers from Rio de Janeiro (city)